Vice Admiral Sir John Felgate Stevens KBE CB (1 June 1900 – 10 December 1989) was a Royal Navy officer who went on to be Commander-in-Chief, America and West Indies Station.

Naval career
Stevens joined the Royal Navy in 1918 and served in the closing stages of World War I. After the War he went to King's College, Cambridge, and then specialised in navigation.

He also served in World War II as captain of HMS Cleopatra from August 1942 to July 1943 and then became Director of Plans at the Admiralty in 1946. He was appointed Chief of Staff to the Head of British Joint Services Mission to Washington, D.C., in 1950 and Flag Officer, Home Fleet Training Squadron, in 1952. He went on to be Commander-in-Chief, America and West Indies Station, and Deputy Supreme Allied Commander, Atlantic, in 1953. He retired in 1956.

References

1900 births
1989 deaths
Alumni of King's College, Cambridge
Companions of the Order of the Bath
Knights Commander of the Order of the British Empire
Royal Navy vice admirals